Neil Warren Jones (born 16 February 1982) is a New Zealand collegiate soccer coach and former professional footballer. Jones is the current head coach of the Wisconsin Badgers men's soccer team at the University of Wisconsin–Madison.

Early life and education 
Jones was born 16 February 1982 in Takapuna, New Zealand, to parents Fran and Barry Jones. Growing up in New Zealand, he spent time with many football clubs, among them Rangitoto (Juniors), East Coast Bays AFC, Dunedin Technical, Waitakere City F.C., and Westlake Boys High School. He would later attend the University of Otago briefly before transferring to the University of California, Santa Barbara.

While at UCSB, Jones was a student-athlete on the UC Santa Barbara Gauchos men's soccer team, studying in the nationally-ranked UCSB Geography Program. Alongside fellow Kiwi freshman defender Tony Lochhead, Jones appeared in 14 games, scoring 3 goals and adding an assist. He was moved in his second year from defense to forward by coach Tim Vom Steeg. As a forward, Jones led the attack for the Gauchos and culminated in an appearance of the 2004 NCAA Division I Men's Soccer Championship final match, losing on penalties.  For his UCSB career, Jones appeared in 75 games and scored 36 goals with 15 assists.

Professional playing career 
While enrolled at UCSB, Jones appeared for Cape Cod Crusaders of the USL PDL.  In 2004 alongside Gaucho teammate Drew McAthy, Jones appeared in 9 games and scored 3 goals.

After leaving Santa Barbara, Jones went on trial with European clubs, including Atlético Madrid and Aalesunds FK, in hopes of securing a professional contract. While with Aalesunds FK, the training staff were impressed with his play and wanted Jones to play in front of manager Ivar Morten Normark, who had been out on holiday. He appeared in a friendly match for Aalesunds against IL Hødd, but he was forced to leave just minutes from the start after fracturing his leg, ending his trial with the club.

After rehabbing from his injury, Jones spent time with East Coast Bays AFC. He later signed a short-term contract with Queensland Roar FC of the A-League. Jones was unable to find his way on to the opening day roster and never competed in a league game for Queensland.

He spent time with Kuala Lumpur FA of the Malaysia Premier League before ending his playing career in 2005.

International playing career 
Neil has represented New Zealand at the U17, U20, U23, and Senior International squads. As a member of the New Zealand U17 "dream team", Jones competed in the 1999 FIFA U-17 World Championship held in New Zealand. He appeared in all three of New Zealand's Group A games, but New Zealand failed to advance.

Jones was named to the New Zealand senior international team for the 2004 OFC Nations Cup for 2006 FIFA World Cup qualification.  He made his debut on 4 June 2004 against Tahiti national football team and scored a goal. His last appearance was two days later on 6 June against Fiji.

Coaching career 
It was announced in March 2006 that Jones was added to the UC Santa Barbara Gauchos men's soccer team coaching staff by Tim Vom Steeg as an assistant coach. The team would go on to win the 2006 NCAA Division I Men's Soccer Championship.

After four seasons at his alma mater, Jones moved on to be an assistant coach at Northwestern University in Evanston, Illinois, under Tim Lenahan. Ahead of the 2012 season, Jones was promoted to associate head coach.

On 20 December 2012, Jones was introduced as the head coach of Loyola University Chicago's men's soccer team.

On 10 January 2022, Jones was hired as the head coach of the Wisconsin Badgers men's soccer team, replacing John Trask.

Record by year
Source:

Notes

References

External links 
 
 Loyola coaching profile
 Northwestern coaching profile
 UC Santa Barbara coaching profile
 New Zealand Soccer Association player profile
 UC Santa Barbara player profile

1982 births
Living people
Association footballers from Auckland
New Zealand association footballers
Association football defenders
Association football forwards
UC Santa Barbara Gauchos men's soccer players
Cape Cod Crusaders players
New Zealand international footballers
Brisbane Roar FC players
East Coast Bays AFC players
Kuala Lumpur City F.C. players
Association football utility players
People educated at Westlake Boys High School
USL League Two players
2004 OFC Nations Cup players
UC Santa Barbara Gauchos men's soccer coaches
New Zealand association football coaches
Wisconsin Badgers men's soccer coaches
People from Takapuna
Loyola Ramblers men's soccer coaches